Linowiec may refer to the following places:
Linowiec, Greater Poland Voivodeship (west-central Poland)
Linowiec, Kuyavian-Pomeranian Voivodeship (north-central Poland)
Linówiec, Kuyavian-Pomeranian Voivodeship (north-central Poland)
Linowiec, Pomeranian Voivodeship (north Poland)
Linowiec, Warmian-Masurian Voivodeship (north Poland)